Hun Many (born 27 November 1982) is a Cambodian politician. He is the youngest son of the Cambodian Prime minister Hun Sen and his wife, Bun Rany. Many is currently a Member of the National Assembly of Cambodia, representing Kampong Speu Province.

Personal life 
Many is married to Yim Chhay Lin, the daughter of Yim Chhaily.

References

1982 births
Living people
Cambodian Buddhists
21st-century Cambodian politicians 
Children of prime ministers of Cambodia 
Children of national leaders 
Members of the National Assembly (Cambodia)
Cambodian People's Party politicians
Cambodian politicians of Chinese descent
Hofstra University alumni
National Defense University alumni
University of Melbourne alumni
Recipients of the Padma Shri in public affairs
Hun family
Hun Sen
People from Phnom Penh